Steamboat Rock is a rock formation in the Garden of the Gods in Colorado Springs, Colorado.  It is easily accessible by paved road and is a popular spot for tourist photography.  The rock was once privately owned, and tourists climbed upon the rock for photographs of it and nearby Balanced Rock. Climbing upon the rock is now prohibited.  The stairs leading up the spine of the formation are still visible.

References

Rock formations of Colorado
Tourism in Colorado
Landforms of El Paso County, Colorado